Torre Banc de Sabadell (also known as BancSabadell) is an office skyscraper in Barcelona, Catalonia, Spain. Completed in 1969, it has 23 floors and rises 83 meters.

See also 
 List of tallest buildings and structures in Barcelona

References

External links

Skyscraper office buildings in Barcelona

Office buildings completed in 1969